Itzstedt is an Amt ("collective municipality") in the districts of Segeberg and Stormarn, in Schleswig-Holstein, Germany. The seat of the Amt is in Itzstedt.

Overview
It is one of the two Ämter (with Großer Plöner See) in Germany that joins municipalities into two different districts, but only Tangstedt is located in Stormarn.

Subdivision
The Amt Itzstedt consists of the following municipalities:

Itzstedt
Kayhude 
Nahe 
Oering 
Seth 
Sülfeld 
Tangstedt (Stormarn district)

References

External links
 Amt Itzstedt official site

Ämter in Schleswig-Holstein